This is a list of football (soccer) clubs in Brunei.

Singapore Premier League
 Duli Pengiran Muda Mahkota (DPMM) FC

Brunei Super League
 Angkatan Kampong Setia (AKSE) Bersatu
 Bahtera Kemudi Sekawan (BAKES) FC
 Brunei Shell Recreation Club (BSRC) FC
 Ikatan Kampong Lurong Sekuna-Mulaut Ban 5 (IKLS-MB5) FC 
 Indera SC
 Jerudong FC
 Kasuka FC
 Kuala Belait FC
 Kota Ranger FC
 Lun Bawang FC
 Majlis Sukan Angkatan Bersenjata Diraja Brunei (MS ABDB)
 Majlis Sukan Pasukan Polis Diraja Brunei (MS PPDB)
 Panchor Murai FC
 Rimba Star FC
 Setia Perdana FC
 Wijaya FC

District Leagues

Brunei Muara District League
Admirul Red Star FC
Almerez FA
Ar Rawda FT
Dagang FT
Deno FC
Miisa United
MSN United FC
Perka United FC
Persatuan Kampong Saba (Perkasa) FC
Seri Wira FC
Wondrous FT

Belait District League
Akhdan ST
Hawa FC
Hoist FT
High Revolution (HR) FT
Liang Lumut Belait ST
Menggelela FC
Nelayan FT
Nusantara FC

Tutong District League
Azmainshah FT
Bamit FC
Bang Dalam FC
Dato Pemancha Saging (DPS) Ukong
Luang Family Team
Pakatan Sang Jati Dusun FC
Perda FC
PMS FC
TDAFA U-20
Tutong Hotspurs FT
T-Team
Persatuan Pemuda-Pemudi Melayu Lamunin (3PML) FC

Other clubs

Brunei Food Awards (BFA) FC
Tanoshi FC
Rainbow FC
Muara Youth FC
Majra FC
Menglait FC
Let's Go (LG) FC
FC Phosphor
Belia Kampong Saba (BESA) FC
Tabuan Muda
Gladiators Force FT
Plan Batu FC
Samudra FC
Sewira FC
Sinar FC
Telbru FT
Belabau FC
Pandan 14
Najip FC
Darussalam Soccer Players (DSP) United
Tunas FC
Bebuloh FC
Ikerab FC
Kilanas FC
Kilugos FC
Peseja United
Savilla FC
Seri Bolkiah FC
Sporting Family Team
Al-Idrus FC
Bentara United FC
Pandan FA
WLF FC
Great United
QAF FC
LLRC FT
Majra FC
BIBD SRC

See also
List of NFABD-registered clubs

Brunei
 
Football clubs
Football clubs